Stefan Lundqvist (born February 18, 1978) is a Swedish former professional ice hockey player.  He played in the Elitserien for Brynäs IF. He was drafted 180th overall in the 1998 NHL Entry Draft by the New York Rangers.

External links

1978 births
Living people
Almtuna IS players
Brynäs IF players
Mora IK players
New York Rangers draft picks
Skellefteå AIK players
Swedish ice hockey right wingers
VIK Västerås HK players